Acaricis urigersoni is a species of mite.

Distribution
The species is found in New Zealand.

References

Animals described in 2013
Acari of New Zealand
Terrestrial biota of New Zealand
Trombidiformes